Kegan may refer to:

Kübra Kegan, a Turkish volleyball player
Robert Kegan, an American developmental psychologist
Kegan Lake, a lake in Minnesota

See also
Keegan